Thunderful Group AB is a Swedish video game holding company based in Gothenburg. It was founded in December 2019 through a merger between Thunderful AB (Bergsala Holding's video game holding) and Bergsala Holding's distribution business, consisting of Bergsala, Amo Toys, and Nordic Game Supply. The former Thunderful had been founded in December 2017 between Bergsala Holding, Brjánn Sigurgeirsson, and Klaus Lyngeled, incorporating Sigurgeirsson and Lyngeled's indie game studios—Image & Form and Zoink—and acquiring the publisher Rising Star Games from Bergsala Holding in July 2018. Thunderful Group has since acquired further developers, the publisher Headup Games, and the consultancy firm Robot Teddy.

History 
Image & Form and Zoink, two independent video game developers based in Gothenburg, developed a close relationship through their founders and chief executive officers (CEOs), Brjánn Sigurgeirsson and Klaus Lyngeled, respectively, became "practically best friends". Although the two studios were separated by the Göta älv, Sigurgeirsson and Lyngeled met frequently due to the small size of Gothenburg's indie scene. Among other things, Image & Form and Zoink shared testing activities and marketing capabilities. In 2011, Bergsala Holding (the parent company of Bergsala, Nintendo's exclusive distribution partner in Sweden) acquired 50% of Image & Form. When Sigurgeirsson eventually introduced Lyngeled to the company, Bergsala Holding also acquired half of Zoink in 2014.

Sigurgeirsson, Lyngeled and Bergsala Holding decided to merge the two studios and created Thunderful as their parent company in December 2017. The company was jointly owned by the founding parties: Bergsala Holding held a 50% stake and Sigurgeirsson and Lyngeled 25% each. Sigurgeirsson and Lyngeled became the CEO and chief creative officer (CCO), respectively, of Thunderful, while both remained CEOs of their respective studios. The move was announced in January 2018, at which point Thunderful had 46 employees. Alongside the merger, a publishing arm called Thunderful Publishing AB was set up to handle third-party game publishing. Ed Valiente, the former business development manager for Nintendo of Europe, joined Thunderful as head of publishing in April 2018 and became the managing director for Thunderful Publishing. That July, Thunderful acquired Rising Star Games from Bergsala Holding. Valiente subsequently became the managing director for Rising Star Games, replacing the departing Martin Defries, while retaining his previous positions.

In December 2019, Bergsala Holding combined its distribution businesses—Bergsala, Amo Toys, and Nordic Game Supply—with Thunderful, creating the Thunderful Group. The new company was organised into three operational groups: Thunderful Development, containing Image & Form and Zoink; Thunderful Publishing, containing Thunderful Publishing AB and Rising Star Games; and Thunderful Distribution, containing Bergsala, Amo Toys, and Nordic Game Supply. The group remained under the shared ownership of Bergsala Holding, Sigurgeirsson and Lyngeled, and kept its headquarters in Gothenburg. Sigurgeirsson, who became Thunderful Group's CEO, stated that the merger was highly beneficial but evidenced that further financing was needed for future growth, leading Thunderful Group to eye an initial public offering (IPO). Bergsala, as the group's largest entity, was entirely dependent on its partnership with Nintendo at this time.

In February 2020, Thunderful Group acquired Guiding Rules Games AB (Guru Games), a developer based in Skövde. Through the buyout, Thunderful Games' employee count rose to 170. Later that year, Thunderful Group merged Image & Form, Zoink, and Guru Games to form Thunderful Development AB. Thunderful Development opened a fourth studio in Malmö that June. In September 2020, the company opened an online merch store. Its 35 employees were transferred to Thunderful Development.

By November 2020, Thunderful Group was preparing an IPO via the Premier Growth Market of the Nasdaq First North, expecting to raise . The company began trading on 7 December 2020. In its 2020 fiscal year, the company recorded a 46% rise in revenues alongside a fall of net profit by 20%. With the acquisition, Headup's founder and managing director, Dieter Schoeller, is to become Thunderful Group's head of publishing. The acquisition was to close by 31 March 2021. In September 2021, Thunderful Group acquired Madrid, Spain-based developer Stage Clear Studios in a deal worth up to €2.5 million. Alongside purchasing the consultancy firm Robot Teddy in October that year, Thuderful Group established Thunderful Investment and two funds, one for game prototypes and one for virtual reality games, as part of the Thunderful Games segment. In November, Thunderful acquired mobile game developer Early Morning Studio. In November 2022, Thunderful acquired British developer Jumpship for an undisclosed sum.

Operational groups 
Thunderful Groups comprises two operational groups: The Distribution group contains the distributions businesses, and the Games group covers the development, investment, and publishing of games.

Distribution 
 Amo Toys
 Bergsala
 Nordic Game Supply

Games 
 Development
 Coatsink
 Early Morning Studio
 Jumpship
 Stage Clear Studios
 Studio Fizbin
 Thunderful Development AB
 To the Sky
 Investment
 Robot Teddy
 Publishing
 Headup Games
 Rising Star Games
 Thunderful Publishing AB

References

External links 
 

Companies based in Gothenburg
Holding companies established in 2017
Holding companies of Sweden
Joint ventures
Swedish companies established in 2017
Video game companies established in 2017
Video game companies of Sweden
Video game publishers
Companies listed on Nasdaq Stockholm
2020 initial public offerings